Pioneer Airport  is a privately owned airport located two nautical miles (4 km) south of the central business district of Oshkosh, a city in Winnebago County, Wisconsin, United States. The airport is located on the northwest edge of Wittman Regional Airport, with which it co-hosts the EAA AirVenture Oshkosh airshow.

Facilities and aircraft
Pioneer Airport covers an area of 15 acres (6 ha) at an elevation of 826 feet (252 m) above mean sea level. It has one runway: 13/31 is 1,988 by 130 feet (606 x 40 m) with a turf surface. The airport is built to look like a 1930's period airfield.

In January 2023, there were 23 aircraft based at this airport: 20 single-engine, 1 multi-engine and 2 gliders.

On the north end, there are 7 exhibit hangars, the Fergus Chapel, and the Air Academy Lodge. On the south end is the museum/EAA Headquarters.

EAA Museum

The airport is part of the EAA Aviation Museum.
In the hangars are some of the oldest aircraft the museum has, including "Golden Age" (1920s/1930s) biplanes and vintage monoplanes such as Swallow and WACO biplanes, Travel Air, Curtiss Robin, Fairchild FC-2, Stinson Aircraft, Spartan C-3, Great Lakes 2T-1A acrobat, Aeronca K, Monocoupe, Howard DGA, Heath Parasol, Pietenpol Air Camper, and many others, most in special vintage-style hangars.

AirVenture
Despite the fact that the airport co-hosts EAA AirVenture Oshkosh along with Wittman Regional Airport, the airport's runway is closed during the event. Instead, the airport holds kids activities and hosts only arrival and departures of helicopters during AirVenture. It also has been where some blimps were shown during the event.

See also
List of airports in Wisconsin

References

External links 
 Airport page at EAA website
 

Experimental Aircraft Association
Airports in Wisconsin
Buildings and structures in Winnebago County, Wisconsin
Privately owned airports